Ranjitsinh is an Indian masculine given name. Notable people with the name include:
 Ranjitsinh Disale, Indian teacher
 MK Ranjitsinh Jhala, Indian author 
 Ranjitsinh Mohite-Patil, Indian politician
 Ranjitsinh Pratapsinh Gaekwad, Indian politician and the former titular Maharaja of Baroda
 Ranjitsinhji, Indian ruler and cricketer

Indian masculine given names